Graneberg is a suburban part of the city of Uppsala, by Lake Ekoln, a branch of Lake Mälaren.

Geography of Uppsala County
Neighbourhoods of Uppsala